Diaa Raofat (born December 21, 1988) is an Egyptian professional footballer.

Football career 
Raofat plays as a midfielder for BK Avarta, which plays in the Danish 2nd Division East. 
He previously played for the clubs Boldklubben Frem, Ølstykke FC, and Hellerup IK. 
Raofat joined BK Avarta in July 2008 with a contract for a year, which ended on June 30, 2009.

External links 
 Egyptian Professional players News
 Egyptian report about Raofat

1988 births
Living people
Egyptian footballers
Egyptian expatriate footballers
Ølstykke FC players
FC Nordsjælland players
Association football midfielders
BK Avarta players